Kanakpura railway station is a small railway station in Jaipur district, Rajasthan. Its code is KKU. It serves Kanakpura area of Jaipur city. The station consists of 2 platforms. The platform is not well sheltered. It got all water, sanitation and shops nearby. The tempo transportation is also available from there and its next to Jaipur Railway station.

Major trains 
Some of the important trains that run from Kanakpura are:
 Bhopal–Jaipur Express
 Jabalpur–Indore Express
 Jaipur–Nagpur Weekly Express
 Jodhpur–Bhopal Passenger
 Jaipur Jn–Suratgarh Jn Passenger (unreserved)
 Ahmedabad–Jaipur Passenger
 Phulera Jn–Jaipur Jn Passenger (unreserved)
 Phulera Ratlam Fast Passenger
 Bayana–Phulera Passenger (unreserved)

See also
 Jaipur district
 Durgapura railway station
 Gandhinagar Jaipur railway station
 Jaipur Junction railway station

References

Railway stations in Jaipur
Railway stations in Jaipur district
Jaipur railway division